Samuel Alston Banks (May 16, 1928 – September 12, 2000) served as president of several American colleges and universities.

Education
Banks received his bachelor's degree in English Literature from Duke University in 1949 and his Master of Divinity degree from Emory University in 1952. He received his Ph.D. in psychology and religion from the University of Chicago in 1971.

Academic appointments
In his early career, Banks held faculty and administrative positions at Drew University and the University of Florida.  In 1975, he was named president of Dickinson College, a position he held until 1986, when he became president of the University of Richmond.  Banks spent only eight months at Richmond before resigning due to health reasons.  He then took faculty and administrative positions at Eckerd College, where he remained until his retirement in 1995.

External links
 History of the University of Richmond: People: Dr. Samuel A. Banks 
 Samuel Alston Banks

1928 births
2000 deaths
Presidents of the University of Richmond
Eckerd College faculty
Duke University Trinity College of Arts and Sciences alumni
Emory University alumni
University of Chicago alumni
People from Florida
University of Florida faculty
Presidents of Dickinson College
20th-century American academics